I, Claudius is a six-part 2010 radio adaptation of Robert Graves' 1934 novel I, Claudius and its 1935 sequel Claudius the God. Broadcast as part of the Classic Serial strand on BBC Radio 4, it was adapted by Robin Brooks and directed by Jonquil Panting, with music composed by David Pickvance. Claudius was played by Tom Goodman-Hill and the series' cast is also notable for including Derek Jacobi, who played Claudius in the 1976 BBC TV adaptation of the same works, now in the role of Augustus. The series was released as a BBC Audiobook on 6 January 2011. It won the 2012 Audie Award in the "Audio Dramatization" category.

Cast
Tom Goodman-Hill as Claudius
Derek Jacobi as Augustus
Harriet Walter as Livia
Tim McInnerny as Tiberius
Alison Pettitt as Julia
Sam Dale as Athenodorus/Sejanus/Tacitus
Sean Baker as Thrasyllus/Pomponius/Cremutius/Asiaticus
Christine Kavanagh as Antonia
Samuel Barnett as Caligula
Henry Devas as Postumus/Callistus
Trevor Peacock as Pollio
Hattie Morahan as Agrippina the Elder
Zubin Varla as Herod Agrippa
Jude Akuwudike as Cato/Cassius Chaerea/Plautius/Burrhus
Tony Bell as Macro/Frontinus
Sally Orrock as Calpurnia
Claire Harry as Agrippinilla (Agrippina the Younger)
Harvey Allpress as Young Claudius
Jessica Raine as Messalina
Robin Soans as Narcissus
Ryan Watson as Britannicus
Adeel Akhtar as Euodus
Iain Batchelor as Soldier

Episodes
 Augustus (broadcast 28 November 2010)
 Tiberius (broadcast 5 December 2010)
 Sejanus (broadcast 12 December 2010)
 Caligula (broadcast 19 December 2010)
 Claudius (broadcast 26 December 2010)
 Messalina (broadcast 2 January 2011)

References

2010 radio programme debuts
Radio programmes based on novels
British radio dramas
Period radio series
Radio programmes set in ancient Rome
I, Claudius
Cultural depictions of Augustus
Cultural depictions of Claudius
Cultural depictions of Livia